FL 7 or FL-7 can refer to:
FL-7 rocket
Florida's 7th congressional district
Florida State Road 7